Samuel Yves Mézec (born 26 December 1990), is a Jersey politician who is the leader of Reform Jersey. He has been a member of the States Assembly since 2014, serving as both a Deputy and later as a Senator.

Political career
Mézec was elected as the Deputy for the St. Helier No. 2 district after winning that seat in a by-election on 5 March 2014. He held the seat in the general election held later that year on 15 October.

He co-founded and, until June 2019, was the Chairman of Reform Jersey, one of the island's political parties. He stood in the Senatorial by-election held on 7 September 2016 but came second to Sarah Ferguson.

Mézec was elected as Senator in the 2018 general election with 40.8% of the popular vote, and on the 3rd of July 2018, he was the first politician to take on the combined role of Minister of Children and Housing.

After two and half years in government, on the 8th of November 2020 Mézec resigned from his Ministerial role to support a vote of no confidence against the Chief Minister, Senator John Le Fondré.

For the 2022 general election, the position of Senator was abolished and all candidates stood as Deputies or Constables, meaning Mézec would be running again for his previous role as a Deputy. Electoral reforms introduced that year also saw Jersey's constituencies changed, with Mézec's local district now being called 'St Helier South' instead of 'St Helier No. 2'. He was re-elected, along with nine other Reform Jersey members.

Following the party's election success, Deputy Mézec challenged Kristina Moore for the role of Chief Minister, but he was defeated by 39 votes to 10. He was later elected to Deputy Moore's previous role leading the island's Scrutiny function as the Chairman of the Corporate Services Scrutiny Panel.

Election results

References 

1990 births
Living people